The 2022 Battery World Aussie Racing Car Super Series was an Australian motor racing series for Aussie Racing Cars, which are silhouette racing cars which use Yamaha FJ1300 engines and Kumho Tyres. The series commenced at Sydney Motorsport Park on 4 March, and concluded on 21 August at Sandown Raceway. Due to the COVID-19 induced cancellation of the 2021 series, there was no defending series champion.

The series was won by Joshua Anderson.

Entries

Calendar

Results

Summary

Points System

Championship: Championship Points based on Round Position.
Class: Class Points based on Round Position in class.

Points Table

Drivers' Championship

Rookie Championship

References

External links

Aussie Racing Cars
Aussie Racing Cars